Cosmodela duponti is a species of tiger beetle with wide distribution range in South and Southeast Asia. They are found mainly in forested habitats. 

The species is distinct in its large size with iridescent blue and purple body with four white spots. There are hairs below the head (genal region) and the lateral pronotal margins are smooth and unhaired. There is considerable geographic variation and the nominate subspecies is from Southeast Asia. Specimens from India may be assigned to C. duponti barmanica but there may be more than one subspecies in India. They are found mainly along forests and near water. There are several subspecies that are recognized. The species was named after Henry Dupont, a trader in specimens from whom the French entomologist Pierre François Marie Auguste Dejean had obtained a specimen noted as being collected from "Cochinchina" (Vietnam) in 1826.

References 

Beetles described in 1826
Beetles of Asia
Cicindelidae